Herat attack or Herat campaign may refer to:

Herat campaign of 1729
Herat campaign of 1731
Herat campaign of 1862–1863
2001 uprising in Herat
2013 attack on U.S. consulate in Herat
2014 attack on Indian consulate in Herat
June 2017 Herat mosque bombing
August 2017 Herat mosque attack
Fall of Herat, in 2021
Herat bus bombing, in 2022
2022 Herat mosque bombing

See also
Siege of Herat (disambiguation)